Coolringdon is a locality in the Local Government Area of the Snowy Monaro Regional Council, in the Monaro region of New South Wales, Australia. It lies in the foothills of the Snowy Mountains, west of Cooma.

The area now known as Coolringdon lies on the traditional lands of the Ngarigo people. Called 'Coolerandong' by early colonial settlers, it is likely that the name of Coolringdon is derived from an Aboriginal language word that has been anglicised. 

The area lay outside the Nineteen Counties, and settlers had no legal right—even under colonial law—to occupy land there, until 1836, after which grazing rights could be obtained by payment of a licence fee.

The locality takes its name from a sheep station of the same name, which dates from 1829, and was one of the earliest colonial settlements in the Monaro. It was taken up as a squatting run by Stewart Ryrie, Deputy Commissary General of N.S.W. and patriarch of the Ryrie family of colonial settlers. 

By 1845, it was being managed by Stewart Ryrie's son, Stewart Ryrie, Jun., on behalf of its new owner, Dr. F. L. Wallace. Later, it was a part of the extensive landholdings of William Bradley. 

It is now owned and managed, by the John and Betty Casey Research Trust, as a working farm promoting best practice primary production and land management, and to preserve the historic homestead and garden.

The Coolringdon homestead is renowned for its garden. Its old schoolhouse is a part of the original homestead building and is over 190 years old.

Coolringdon is notable as being one of the proposed sites for Australia's national capital, prior to the selection of Canberra. It had a public school from 1879 to 1918.

Reference section

Localities in New South Wales
Snowy Mountains
Snowy Monaro Regional Council
Proposed sites for national capital of Australia